Rabbi Dov Berish Einhorn (1877 – 1942) was the Chief Rabbi and Rosh Yeshiva of Amstov (Mstów), Poland.

Biography
Dov Berish Einhorn was born in 1877 in the small town Mstów (Yiddish: Amstov), Poland where his father, Efraim Tzvi served as the town Rabbi. In Amstov, Efraim Tzvi established one of the first formal yeshivas in all of Poland.

In 1888, at age 11, Dov Berish was sent to Olkusz to study the Torah for three years under the tutelage of Rabbi Lublinski. With the encouragement of the Radomsker Rebbe, Dov Berish excelled in his studies. After mastering and memorizing several tractates of gemara, he was tested by his father and then accepted into his yeshiva in Amstov, where was considered one of the best students. At age 15, he married Rachel, the daughter of Rabbi Pinchas Menachem Justman. Dov Beirish then settled in his wife Rachel's hometown of Ger where his father-in-law and his wife's uncle, Rabbi Yehudah Aryeh Leib Alter, encouraged him to continue his  Torah study. After many years of marriage the couple realized that they could not produce a child and agreed to divorce. Rabbi Dov Berish then proceeded to marry the widow of Rabbi Yaakov Yosef Rabinowicz who had been the Rabbi of Klobutzk, author of emes l'yakov and son of Rabbi Avraham Yissachar Dov Rabinowicz.

Rabbi and Rosh Yeshiva
In 1901 Einhorn's father, Efraim Tzvi died and the Jewish community in Amstov appointed him to succeed his father as both Rabbi and Rosh Yeshiva. Einhorn then received Rabbinical ordination from Rabbi Yitzhak Yehudah Shmelkis, Chief Rabbi of Levov and author of Bais Yitzchok    , Divrei Yitzchok and Siach Yitzchok. Upon assuming leadership of the yeshiva, he chose to rename it Nachlas Efraim, in memory of his father. Under his leadership, the yeshiva was considered one of the most prestigious and exclusive in all of Poland. Einhorn continued to lead the yeshiva for almost 40 years. Among his notable students was Rabbi Shlomo Zev Zweigenhaft, who was Rosh Hashochtim of Poland and later became Chief Rabbi of Hannover and Lower Saxony.

Death
When the Nazis invaded Poland, Einhorn was forced to relocate to the ghetto in Radomsko. In 1942, during the holiday of Shavuot, Nazi soldiers ordered Einhorn to board a train to the Treblinka extermination camp, he refused and the Nazis shot and killed him.

Works
In 1990 Einhorn's torah insights were posthumously published together with those of his father, in a book called Shearis Efraim-Dov.

References

Rosh yeshivas
20th-century Polish rabbis
1942 deaths
Hasidic rabbis in Europe
Polish Jews who died in the Holocaust
Polish Hasidic rabbis
1877 births
Executed people from Silesian Voivodeship
Jewish Polish writers
People from Częstochowa County